Wyatt C. Kaldenberg (born 1957 in California, USA) is an American white supremacist and a supporter of Tom Metzger's Neo-Nazi White Aryan Resistance (WAR) organization. He is also an Odinist (a type of Germanic neopaganism), and an author of several books.

Early life
Kaldenberg was born in a working-class Mormon family in a small California town in the Mojave Desert. As a teenager he was associated with the Young Socialist Alliance, a Trotskyist organization.

Enrolling in a Job Corps training programme in Salt Lake City in the 1970s, Kaldenberg became "aware of racial realities" after having fights with blacks and Muslims.

White Aryan Resistance
In the early 1970s Kaldenberg joined Tom Metzger's White Aryan Resistance.  He was the managing editor of their paper WAR until 1989 and Metzger's bodyguard.

SPLC lawsuit
In October 1990, the Southern Poverty Law Center and the Anti-Defamation League won a civil judgement against Metzger and WAR on behalf of the family of Mulugeta Seraw, who was murdered by white power skinheads associated with the group. Metzger then encouraged his supporters to send donations to Kaldenberg rather than to him or to WAR, in order to avoid paying the judgement. Kaldenberg was the subject of a court order freezing his funds, pending court review.  In January 1991, Kaldenberg began withdrawing money from the frozen account just hours after the order was issued. He was ordered by a San Diego municipal judge to return it. Kaldenberg refused to obey the order and was jailed for 10 days for contempt of court.

Odinism

Kaldenberg was briefly involved with Stephen A. McNallen's Ásatrú Free Assembly but left when McNallen ejected Nazis from that organization.  Kaldenberg and other "Aryanists" who left the AFA at that time went on to found the Greater Los Angeles area chapter of the Odinist Fellowship.

After leaving the AFA, Kaldenberg developed a distinct variety of Odinism.  He devalues spirituality and ceremony and rejects Judeo-Christianity.  According to Nicholas Goodrick-Clarke, Kaldenberg's version of the ideology is "chiefly a cult of aristocracy, power and the propagation of the white race."

Kaldenberg began publishing Pagan Review in the 1990s which was described as "a voice of Eurocentric polytheistic communities."

Written works
 Odinism: The Religion of Our Germanic Ancestors in the Modern World (2011)
 Odinism in the Age of Man: The Dark Age Before the Return of Our Gods (2011)
 Perceived Heathenism and Odinic Prayer: A Book of Heathen Prayer and Direct Contact with Our Living Gods (2011)
 Folkish Odinism (2013)
 Why Nazism and White Racism Suck And Do Nothing But Empower Leftists And Hurt The White Race (2011)
 A Heathen Family Devotional: Odinism Begins at Home (2011)
 Heathen Family Prayer for Beginners: A Collection of Odinic Prayers for Families New to Odinism, Volume 1 (2011)
 Odinism: Inside the Belly of the Beast: Essays on Heathenism inside The New World Order (2011)
 Skertru Now: Issue 2, April 2013, Volume 2 (2013), with Skergard, Volundr Lars Agnarsson, and Skuli Magnusson
 The Oera Linda Book: A Neo-Pagan Fantasy Novel (Introduction)
 Early Writings that Helped Shape American Odinism, Volume 1 (2012), with other writers
 9 Worlds of Hex Magic paperback by Hunter Yoder (featured interview)
 The Death of the White Race

Further reading
 Dobratz, Betty A., Stephanie L. Shanks-Meile, The White Separatist Movement in the United States: "White Power, White Pride!", The Johns Hopkins University Press, 2000
 Gardell, Mattias, Gods of the Blood: The Pagan Revival and White Separatism, Duke University Press, 2003

References

External links
Why I am Against National Socialism by Wyatt Kaldenberg
 Reviving Paganism, Intelligence Report, Winter 2003, Issue Number: 112 - SPLC

Living people
1957 births
Alt-right writers
American neo-Nazis
American non-fiction writers
Writers from California
Adherents of Germanic neopaganism
Ásatrú in the United States
American modern pagans
Modern pagan writers
Former Marxists